Chiba 11th district (千葉県第11区, Chiba-ken dai-jūikku or simply 千葉11区, Chiba-jūikku) is a single-member constituency of the House of Representatives in the national Diet of Japan. It is located in the eastern portion of Chiba Prefecture, and covers the prefecture's Mobara, Tōgane, Katsuura, Isumi, Sanmu, Ōamishirasato, Sanbu District (minus the former town of Hikari, now a part of the town of Yokoshibahikari), Chōsei District, and Isumi District. The district was created in 1994 as part of an electoral reform effort in the Japanese House of Representatives, and was first implemented in the 1996 general election.

As of 2015, this district was home to 365,194 constituents.

List of representatives

Election results

References 

Districts of the House of Representatives (Japan)